Filippo Nogarin (born 4 September 1970 in Livorno) is an Italian politician.

He is a member of the Five Star Movement and he served as Mayor of Livorno from 9 June 2014 to 11 June 2019.

Nogarin was a candidate for the European Parliament at the 2019 European Parliament election in Italy, but was not elected.

See also
2014 Italian local elections
List of mayors of Livorno

References

External links
 

1970 births
Living people
Mayors of Livorno
Five Star Movement politicians